Mokro is a village in Bosnia and Herzegovina. According to the 1991 census, the village is located in the municipality of Široki Brijeg.

Within the municipality of Široki Brijeg, a new settlement Mokro was created by merging the settlements Duboko Mokro and Pribinovići.

Demographics 
According to the 2013 census, its population was 1,411.

References

Populated places in Široki Brijeg